Rear Admiral Herbert James Ray (1 February 1893 – 3 December 1970) was an officer in the United States Navy who served in World War I and World War II. A 1914 graduate of the Naval Academy, he served on the submarines  and  during World War I. In March 1942, as Chief of Staff and Aide to the Commandant of the Sixteenth Naval District, Rear Admiral Francis W. Rockwell, he participated in General Douglas MacArthur's escape from the Philippines. In Australia, he served with MacArthur's General Headquarters, Southwest Pacific Area staff. In September 1943, he became Captain of the battleship , which he commanded in the Battle of Tarawa, Battle of Kwajalein, Battle of Saipan and the Battle of Peleliu. Ray left Maryland in December 1944, and was promoted to Commodore and appointed deputy director of the Naval Division of the US Control Group Council for Germany. After VE Day, he became the Junior United States Member of the Tripartite Naval Commission in Berlin. He retired from the Navy on 30 June 1949, and received a tombstone promotion to rear admiral due to his combat decorations.

Early life 
Herbert James Ray was born in Milwaukee, Wisconsin, on 1 February 1893, the son of James Herbert Ray and his wife Mary née Rosseler. He was educated at Rhea County High School. In 1910, he was appointed to the United States Naval Academy at Annapolis, from which he graduated on 6 June 1914.

On graduation, he was commissioned as an ensign, and joined the crew of the battleship . In July 1915, he became an instructor for enlisted ratings in Norfolk, Virginia. He then became part of the crew that was assembled for the new battleship  in January 1916, and served on it when it was commissioned in March 1916. After the United States declared war on Germany, he underwent submariner training on board the submarine tender  from June to November 1917.

Between the wars 
After the war, Ray was posted to the battleship  in March 1919, the submarine tender  in July 1919, and the destroyer  February 1920. He then became the Executive Officer of the destroyer . He helped fit it out, and then served with it until September 1921.

Ray returned to Annapolis as an instructor with the Electrical Engineering and Physics Department from September 1921 to June 1923. He then served on the transport  until December 1924, when he became the Executive Officer of the destroyer . In 1926, he assumed command of the destroyer . In July, he became Officer in Charge of the Branch Hydrographic Office in Honolulu. He was Aide and Flag Secretary to the Commander Light Cruiser 2 from May 1928 to June 1930; Light Cruiser Divisions, Scouting Fleet from June to September 1930; and Light Cruiser 3 from September 1930 to July 1931. Ray married Helen Louise Jacobs from La Plata, Maryland in 1930. They had two daughters and two sons.

Ray was the Navy Representative on the Joint Army-Navy Selective Services Committee at the War Department in Washington, D.C., from July 1931 to September 1933. He then helped fit out the new cruiser , and became first he First Lieutenant and Damage Control Officer, and then, in February 1935, he Executive Officer. Following the usual pattern of alternating duty afloat and ashore, he returned to Annapolis in July 1936 for a second two-year tour as an instructor, this time in the Department of English and History. In June 1938 he entered the Naval War College at Newport, Rhode Island.

World War II

Southwest Pacific 
In March 1941, Ray became Chief of Staff and Aide to the Commandant of the Sixteenth Naval District, Rear Admiral Francis W. Rockwell, at Cavite, where he was promoted to captain on 1 July 1941. He was serving in this capacity when the Pacific War began. He was awarded the Legion of Merit for his part in the fighting. His citation read:

In March 1942, he participated in General Douglas MacArthur's escape from the Philippines, for which Ray was awarded the Silver Star. His citation read:

In Australia, Ray served with MacArthur's General Headquarters, Southwest Pacific Area. One of his sons, Lieutenant James H. Ray, was on the destroyer  when it was lost with all hands on 9 August 1942. When Ray was ordered back to the United States in January 1943, MacArthur awarded him the Army Distinguished Service Medal. His citation read:

USS Maryland 
Ray served in the office of the Commander in Chief United States Fleet, Admiral Ernest J. King from April to September 1943. He then became Captain of the battleship . The ship had been damaged in the Japanese attack on Pearl Harbor in December 1941 but returned to service. Maryland participated in the Battle of Tarawa in November 1943 as the flagship of Rear Admiral Harry W. Hill's V Amphibious Force and Southern Attack Force, and her guns participated in the shore bombardment. In February 1944, she joined in the Battle of Kwajalein, firing at pillboxes and blockhouses on Roi Island. Maryland'''s guns supported the Battle of Saipan, silencing a pair of coastal guns. On 22 June, she was torpedoed by a Mitsubishi G4M "Betty" bomber, but was repaired in time to join Rear Admiral Jesse B. Oldendorf's Western Fire Support Group in the Battle of Peleliu. Still with Oldendorff's group, but now part of the Vice Admiral Thomas C. Kinkaid's Seventh Fleet, Maryland participated in the Battle of Leyte in October. Ray was awarded a second Silver Star. His citation read:

On 29 November, Maryland was attacked and severely damaged by kamikaze aircraft, and forced to return to Pearl Harbor for repairs. For his services as captain, he was awarded the Bronze Star.

 Germany 
Ray left Maryland'' in December 1944. He was appointed deputy director of the Naval Division of the US Control Group Council for Germany. After VE Day, he became the Junior United States Member of the Tripartite Naval Commission in Berlin. He was promoted to the wartime rank of commodore on 26 June 1945. He returned to the United States in April 1946. For his services in Europe, he was awarded a second Legion of Merit. His citation read:

Later life 
Ray became Commander of the San Francisco Group of the Nineteenth Fleet in June 1946. On 10 July, like many other commodores, he was reduced in rank to captain again. He served in this capacity until he retired on 30 June 1949, at which point he received a tombstone promotion to rear admiral due to his combat decorations. He died on 3 December 1970 at Beale Air Force Base Hospital in California.

Notes

References 

 

1893 births
1970 deaths
United States Navy personnel of World War I
United States Navy World War II admirals
People from New Brunswick, New Jersey
Recipients of the Distinguished Service Medal (US Army)
Recipients of the Legion of Merit
Recipients of the Silver Star
United States Naval Academy alumni
United States Navy admirals
Military personnel from Milwaukee
Military personnel from New Jersey